Gasperich is a quarter in southern Luxembourg City, in southern Luxembourg.

, the quarter has a population of 7,607 inhabitants.

In 2017, major building works began on a new development providing for dozens of large office buildings, hundreds of residences and a new shopping centre and Auchan hypermarket.

Transportation 
Gasperich is served by several city, regional and international bus lines. Just over the municipal boundary lies Howald railway station, which was reopened in December 2017 and offers direct services to Luxembourg City, Esch-sur-Alzette, Bettembourg, Wasserbillig, Troisvierges, Thionville, Metz and Nancy, among others.

Gasperich is served by two Park and Ride car parks: P+R Kockelscheuer, with 552 spaces; and P+R Luxembourg-Sud, with 811 spaces.

References

Quarters of Luxembourg City